Gina Louise Weber  (born 14 February 1963) is a New Zealand softball player. A pitcher, she competed at the 2000 Summer Olympics in Sydney, where the New Zealand team placed sixth in the women's softball tournament.  

In the 2001 New Year Honours, Weber was appointed a Member of the New Zealand Order of Merit, for services to softball.

References

External links

1963 births
Living people
Members of the New Zealand Order of Merit
New Zealand softball players
Olympic softball players of New Zealand
Softball players at the 2000 Summer Olympics
Sportspeople from Huntly, New Zealand